CFNJ-FM is a Canadian radio station that operates at 99.1 FM in Saint-Gabriel-de-Brandon, Quebec. The station is also heard at 88.9 FM in Saint-Zénon, Quebec.

Owned by Radio Nord-Joli inc., the station was licensed in 1983 and began broadcasting in 1985.

The station is a member of the Association des radiodiffuseurs communautaires du Québec.

References

External links
CFNJ
 

CFNJ – Live Stream Radio

Fnj
Fnj
Radio stations established in 1983
1983 establishments in Quebec